The list of Class I roads in Slovakia contains an overview of all communications that are categorized as Class I roads.

See also

 Highways in Slovakia
 Transport in Slovakia
 Controlled-access highway
 Limited-access road

References 

 Miestopis cestných komunikácií (Slovenská správa ciest)

External links 

 https://ww-w.ndsas.sk/narodna-dialnicna-spolocnost
 https://www.ssc.sk/sk/Aktualne.ssc

Highways in Slovakia